Jaysus may refer to:

Jaysus, an Irish slang interjection and alternative name for Jesus of Nazareth 
Jaysus, a mild expletive in many languages. Also a minced oath
Jaysus (rapper) (born 1982), German rapper of Greek origin